Clarice Marion Shaw (née McNab; 22 October 1883 – 27 October 1946) was a Labour Party politician and Member of Parliament in the United Kingdom.

Early life 
She was born at 10 Morton Street, Leith, near Edinburgh, Scotland, on 22 October 1883, the eldest daughter of Thomas Charles McNab, a wire-cloth weaver, and his wife, Mary Deas Fraser. Her father was a high-profile figure in local politics, including being a director of Leith's co-operative association, and played a large part in moulding Clarice's radical and political beliefs in Labour politics.

Clarice combined an interest in education and socialism from an early stage. Inspired by Keir Hardie's published views on religious education, she was a founder member of the Glasgow Socialist Sunday School in the 1890s. After training as a music teacher, at about the age of twenty she began teaching in an elementary school in Leith and became an advocate of the state provision for improved medical and welfare services for schoolchildren. Her election to the Leith school board in April 1922 indicated her ambitions in local government, which were enhanced by her activities in the Women's Labour League—an organisation focusing on the employment and pay of female workers. Her radical approach towards women's rights, which included campaigning for the extension of job opportunities for girls after school, broadened into urging the abolition of children's employment and raising the school leaving age to sixteen. Unlike many of her peers Clarice displayed clear political ambitions.

Career 
By 1913 she had joined the Labour Party, partly out of support for socialist principles, but also as a route into local politics. In November 1913 she was elected to Leith Town Council, giving her the distinction of being the first Labour woman member of a town council in Scotland. As a councillor she took a personal interest in medical and child welfare issues. In 1916 she was appointed as the Women's Labour League representative to attend meetings of the Scottish Executive Committee of the Labour Party. There she met, worked with, and eventually married in Edinburgh in July 1918, Benjamin Howard Shaw, first Secretary of the Scottish Labour Party. The couple complemented each other in terms of political ideas and tastes, teetotalism, and temperance reform. Both she and Ben Shaw were also closely associated with the Glasgow Socialist Sunday School, of which Clarice was the national president for twenty-five years. The marriage did not produce any children. In 1921 they moved to Troon. She was subsequently a member of Troon Town Council and Ayrshire County Council, and during the next twenty years she fulfilled a number of roles in civic administration, continuing her educational campaign and serving as a JP. She was appointed a member of the Scottish Food Council, the price regulation committee for Scotland, and the 1928 Royal Commission on Educational Endowments in Scotland. Twice—in 1929 and 1931—she unsuccessfully fought Ayr Burghs at the general election.

When international tensions began to develop in the 1930s, Clarice initially held to her pacifist principles. She appeared at peace assemblies and in 1935 was one of the key speakers at a women's peace conference in the Keir Hardie Institute. As the fascist threat grew more acute, however, she modified her views. Although she abhorred the many side effects of the Second World War, such as the lowering of educational standards, by 1945 she was demanding total victory and the crushing of German power. Clarice Shaw's activities during the war represented the height of her many achievements. She was chairman of the Scottish Labour Party, a Labour Councillor, and a member of the Scottish Committee of Co-operative, Labour and Trade Union Women, founded—partly by her—in 1934. She had close links with the Scottish Trades Union Congress and the Women's Co-operative Guild in England. When her husband died in October 1942, she committed even more time and energy to the Labour Party.

At the general election in July 1945 she was rewarded by being selected for and winning the Parliamentary seat of Kilmarnock with a 7537 majority over the only other candidate, the Unionist Party Lieutenant-Colonel George E. O. Walker – the first woman Labour Member of Parliament (MP) in Ayrshire. Her services to the Labour Party were recognised by her being chosen as the Secretary of the Scottish Parliamentary Group. Having fulfilled her major ambition to become an MP, Clarice was then struck down by a serious illness shortly afterwards which stopped her ever attending the House of Commons. She continued to deal with her parliamentary correspondence faithfully until she was forced to resign her seat in September 1946. Ben and Clarice Shaw are remembered as one of the most successful and popular partnerships in the Scottish Labour Party. While Ben was shy and introverted, Clarice was a very gifted speaker and orator with the ability to command large audiences, despite her plump and matronly appearance. She was equally adept at handling the affairs of several prestigious governmental committees and commissions.

Death 
She died on 27 October 1946 at 36 Titchfield Road, Troon, and was buried at Troon. At the by-election which followed a young recently demobbed Major Willie Ross was elected MP in her place.

Sources
 Helen Corr; Scottish Labour Leaders 1918-39

External links 
 

1883 births
1946 deaths
People from Leith
Scottish Labour councillors
Scottish Labour MPs
Female members of the Parliament of the United Kingdom for Scottish constituencies
Members of the Parliament of the United Kingdom for Scottish constituencies
UK MPs 1945–1950
20th-century Scottish women politicians
20th-century Scottish politicians
Women councillors in Scotland